Kenneth Dale Irwin Jr. (August 5, 1969 – July 7, 2000) was an American stock car racing driver. He had driven in all three NASCAR national touring series, and had two total victories, both in the Craftsman Truck Series. Before that, he raced in the United States Auto Club against Tony Stewart, who was one of his fiercest rivals. He died as a result of injuries suffered in a crash during a practice session at New Hampshire Motor Speedway.

Early life
Irwin grew up in Indianapolis and was the third youngest of four children. He began racing quarter-midgets before he was in the second grade. He graduated from Lawrence North High School in 1988 where he played varsity soccer, while continuing his career as a driver. Between 1988 and 1991, he earned his SCCA competition license and competed in the GT1 category, driving a turbocharged Buick Grand National, then raced for his father in the IMSA American Challenge (road racing) stock car series, all while he was still a teenager.

Irwin then went on to race in USAC. He began open wheel racing in 1991. He had 7 career USAC Sprint Car Series wins, and was the series Rookie of the Year in 1993. In 1994 he was the USAC Silver Crown Series Rookie of the Year and finished second in the 1995 USAC standings. In 1996 he was the USAC National Midget Series champ. After his successful run in USAC, many open-wheel enthusiasts began comparing him to NASCAR's Jeff Gordon.

NASCAR 

Irwin began his major-league NASCAR career in the Craftsman Truck Series. He made his debut in that series in 1996 at Phoenix International Raceway, driving the No. 26 Ford F-150 for MB Motorsports. He started and finished 32nd after an engine failure. In his second start at Richmond International Raceway, he won the pole in the No. 62 Raybestos Ford for Liberty Racing, finishing fifth in the event.

He moved up to drive full-time in 1997, driving the No. 98 Ford for Liberty Racing. He had 2 wins, 7 Top 5, and 10 Top 10 finishes that season, on his way to a 10th-place finish in the final point standings. He also won Rookie of the Year honors that season. Irwin also made his debut in the Winston Cup Series in 1997 with David Blair Motorsports at Richmond. He qualified on the outside pole and led for twelve laps, finishing in eighth place. He ran three more races with Blair that season, qualifying no worse than eleventh.

Irwin won the 1998 Rookie of the Year award in the Cup Series driving the Robert Yates Racing No. 28 car, replacing Ernie Irvan. Irwin started the 1998 season by winning the Automobile Racing Club of America race in Daytona in February in a car owned by Yates. During that season, he had one pole, 1 Top 5, and 4 Top 10 finishes on his way to a disappointing 28th-place finish in the final points standings. In 1999 he had 2 poles, 2 Top 5 and 6 Top 10 finishes and finished 19th-place finish in the final points standings.

Irwin made his debut in the NASCAR Busch Series in 1999, driving the No. 11 Ford Taurus owned by his teammate, Dale Jarrett, and then-Green Bay Packers quarterback Brett Favre. He had two fifth-place finishes in five starts in the series during the 1999 season, at Texas Motor Speedway and Dover International Speedway, respectively.

He is also known for one incident where he bumped the car of Tony Stewart, a former rival of his in USAC open-wheel competition, into the wall in the NAPA Autocare 500 at Martinsville Speedway. After Stewart wrecked Irwin twice in the same race in turn 4, Irwin retaliated against Stewart by spinning him in turn 1 on the restart. Stewart exited his wrecked car, clapped at Irwin, threw his gloves at his car, and tried to enter Irwin's car as it was driving under the caution flag in a show of displeasure.

For the 2000 season Irwin was tabbed by Felix Sabates to replace Joe Nemechek in Team SABCO's No. 42 Chevrolet. He had a single Top 10 finish, 4th at Talladega Superspeedway, in his first 17 races with the team. He made nine starts in the Busch Series for SABCO as well, posting a best finish of ninth at Talladega. His final race for the team was at Daytona International Speedway in the Pepsi 400, finishing 22nd; he was seen as having a bright future with the team, which had just had a majority interest purchased by Chip Ganassi.

Death
During practice for the thatlook.com 300 at New Hampshire Motor Speedway on July 7, 2000, Irwin slammed head on into the wall, causing his car to flip onto its side. According to fellow driver Brett Bodine speaking to CNN, the car slid along its side for a long time before rolling on its roof. Irwin likely died instantly of a basilar skull fracture. He was 30 years old, and died less than a month before his 31st birthday. Fellow Indiana native (and rival) Tony Stewart would win the race that Sunday, and donate the trophy to Irwin's parents. Irwin's accident was blamed on a stuck throttle, which was the same cause of the accident that had killed Adam Petty at nearly that exact spot on the track just two months prior. Ted Musgrave drove the renumbered No. 01 car for the remainder of the 2000 season. The car was renumbered to 41 in 2002 and Sabates brought back the 42 number in 2003 with driver Jamie McMurray.

Irwin's parents founded the Kenny Irwin Jr Foundation and the Dare to Dream Camp for underprivileged children located in New Castle, Indiana in his honor.

The 2000 Brickyard 400, held on what would have been Irwin's 31st birthday, was dedicated in his memory.

Motorsports career results

NASCAR
(key) (Bold – Pole position awarded by qualifying time. Italics – Pole position earned by points standings or practice time. * – Most laps led.)

Winston Cup Series

Daytona 500

Busch Series

Craftsman Truck Series

Winston West Series

ARCA Bondo/Mar-Hyde Series
(key) (Bold – Pole position awarded by qualifying time. Italics – Pole position earned by points standings or practice time. * – Most laps led.)

References

External links

 Kenny Irwin Jr. Foundation
 
 Remembering Kenny Irwin at NASCAR.com
 Dare to Dream Camp - Link

1969 births
2000 deaths
Racing drivers from Indianapolis
NASCAR drivers
ARCA Menards Series drivers
American Speed Association drivers
Racing drivers who died while racing
Sports deaths in New Hampshire
Burials in Indiana
Robert Yates Racing drivers
USAC Silver Crown Series drivers